Amantis vitalisi is a species of praying mantis native to Vietnam.

References

vitalisi
Insects of Vietnam
Mantodea of Asia
Insects described in 1927